Jesús Castro-Balbi is an internationally recognized cellist, pedagogue, higher education and community leader. As of July 2022, Dr. Castro-Balbi assumed the position of Interim Associate Dean at Kennesaw State University Journey Honors College .

Biography

Background
Of Peruvian heritage and raised in France, Jesús Castro-Balbi graduated from the Conservatoire de Lyon, Indiana University Bloomington, the Yale School of Music, and holds a Doctor of Musical Arts degree from The Juilliard School. His mentors include Iseut Chuat, Marc Coppey, Jean Deplace, Aldo Parisot, Janos Starker, and members of the Amadeus, Borodine, Juilliard, Ravel and Tokyo String Quartets.

Teaching
Dr. Castro-Balbi is a leader of international repute committed to building communities through the arts and education. As the newly appointed director at Kennesaw State University’s Dr. Bobbie Bailey School of Music, he manages and leads all aspects of the School.

Prior to joining Kennesaw State University, Dr. Castro-Balbi served as a professor and faculty leader at Texas Christian University. There, he built an internationally sought-after cello program. As a proponent of progressive programs and pedagogies, he developed the curriculum and led initiatives leveraging inclusive excellence, educational technology, multidisciplinary collaboration, community-based learning, and student research. Meanwhile, he served as founding artistic director of the TCU Cellofest and of the Faculty & Friends Chamber Music Series, raising the profile of the School of Music in the discipline and in the community.

A renowned educator, he has guest taught at Beijing’s Central Conservatory of Music, Paris Conservatoire, Leipzig and Stuttgart Hochschule, for the Japan Cello Society, at The Juilliard School, and at the Yale School of Music. Additionally, he has adjudicated at the Lynn Harrell Competition (Dallas), the Sphinx Competition (Michigan), and at the Aiqin Bei (China), Lutoslawski (Poland) and Carlos Prieto (Mexico) international cello competitions.

Leadership
In addition to his pedagogical pursuits Dr. Castro-Balbi is a dedicated university citizen and has led campus-wide forums on academic profile, budget, employee compensation, and strategic planning. As Faculty Senate chair at Texas Christian University, he engaged all stakeholders on a range of initiatives that moved the institution forward, including the creation of the Diversity, Equity, and Inclusion University Committee.

As a member of the 2018-19 cohort of American Council on Education Fellows, he developed higher education leadership capacity with the senior executive at the University of Miami and at campuses across the nation. At Miami, his focus was on academic innovation, administrative excellence, and strategic plan implementation. Additionally, he completed the Management Development Program at the Harvard Graduate School of Education.

Performance
A critically acclaimed concert cellist, he has performed in the US, Latin America, Europe and Asia, collaborating in chamber music with Arkady Fomin, David Korevaar, Henning Kraggerud, Gloria Lin and Michael Shih, and as a member of the Caminos del Inka String Quartet, the Clavier Trio, and the Lin / Castro-Balbi Duo. 

As a soloist, he has partnered with conductors Giancarlo Andretta, Linus Lerner, Richard McKay, Carlos Miguel Prieto, Arild Remmereit, Joel Sachs, Gregory Vajda, and the Aarhus Symphony Orchestra, Dallas Symphony Orchestra, and the Fort Worth Symphony Orchestra; the Dallas Chamber Symphony; the China Philharmonic Orchestra, Louisiana Philharmonic Orchestra and Mexico City Philharmonic Orchestra; the Leipzig Radio Orchestra; and the National Symphony Orchestra of Peru. He has been featured at New York’s Alice Tully Hall, over a dozen times at Carnegie Hall, at the Shanghai Oriental Arts Center and at Tokyo’s Suntory Hall. 

Dr. Castro-Balbi has long been a strong proponent of new music, as an integral part of the human experience. His repertoire stretches from Osvaldo Golijov’s Azul and Arlington Jones’ Soul Unity Suite to Lutoslawski’s Cello Concerto. To date, he has presented 53 premiere performances, the world premiere recording of 19 works, and is the dedicatee of 19 compositions, including works by Esteban Benzecry, Martin Blessinger, Fang Dongqing, Blaise Ferrandino, Kotaro Kobayashi, Till Meyn, Octavio Vázquez, Hailey Woodrow, and Samuel Zyman. Other highlights include: the New York premiere of Mark-Anthony Turnage’s Cello Concerto Kai; the first recording of the complete music for cello and piano by Robert Rodriguez; and the premieres, with Germán Gutiérrez and the TCU Symphony Orchestra, of Edgar Valcárcel’s Concerto Indio and of Jimmy López’s cello concerto, Lord of the Air, and the subsequent recording of the latter for Harmonia Mundi with the Norwegian Radio Orchestra led by Miguel Harth-Bedoya.

Honors and awards
 College of Fine Arts Award for Distinguished Achievement as a Creative Teacher and Scholar, TCU, 2012
 Commendation "in Recognition of Contributions and Support to the Central Conservatory of Music's Mission and to Furthering Education in Cello Performance." Beijing, China, 2012
 Deans' Research and Creativity Award, TCU, 2008
 Salon de Virtuosi – Schwartz Foundation Award, New York, New York, 2004
 Victor Elmaleh Prize, Concert Artist Guild, New York, New York, 2003
 First Prize, Carlos Prieto Latin American Cello Competition, Mexico, 2000
 Winner, Cello Concerto Competition, Verbier Academy, Switzerland, 2000
 Aldo Parisot Prize, Yale University, Connecticut, 1999
 Winner, Woolsey Hall Concerto Competition, Yale University, Connecticut, 1999
 First Prize, European Chamber Music Competition, Privas, France, 1996
 First Prize, First Chamber Music Competition, Guidel, France, 1994
 First Prize, Conservatoire National Supérieur de Musique, Lyon, France, 1995
 Gold Medal in Cello Performance, Conservatoire National de Région, Lyon, France, 1992
 Gold Medal in Chamber Music, Conservatoire National de Région, Lyon, France, 1992

Discography 
 Norwegian Radio Orchestra, Miguel Harth-Bedoya, conductor. Jimmy Lopez The Lord of the Air: Cello Concerto (world premiere recording). Harmonia Mundi, recorded April 2014.
 Apuntes Sobre La Historia De La Música En México: Obras Mexicanas Para Violonchelo. Samuel Zyman Suite for Two Cellos (selections). Compact disc recording with Carlos Prieto. Re-release from Aprieto (Urtext Digital Classics, 2001). Seminario de Cultura Mexicana, 2013.
 Vienna and Café Music. Compact disc recording with the Clavier Trio. Joseph Haydn Trio in C major, Hob. XV:27; Johannes Brahms Trio in B Major, Op. 8; and Paul Schoenfield Café Music. Clavier Trio, 2012.
 Contemporary Art Music in Texas. Martin Blessinger The Paul Bunyan Suite (selections). Compact disc recording with Gloria Lin. Produced by International Society for Contemporary Music. Stephen F. Austin State U. Press, 2012.
 Robert Rodriguez: Complete Music for Cello and Piano. Compact disc recording with Gloria Lin, piano. Tentado por la Samba (world premiere recording), Máscaras (world premiere recording), Ursa (world premiere recording), Favola I (world premier recording) and Lull-A-Bear (world premiere recording). Albany Records, 2012. TROY1355.
 Transfigured Night. Compact disc recording with the Clavier Trio. Arnold Schönberg Verklärte Nacht and Sergei Rachmaninov Trio Elégiaque in D Minor, Op. 9. Clavier Trio, 2010.
 Robert Xavier Rodriguez: Chamber Works. Compact disc recording with the Clavier Trio et al. Trio II and of Sor(tri)lege: Trio III (world premiere recordings). Albany Records, 2009. TROY1136.
 Conversation with Bill Lively. DVD featuring music performed by Clavier Trio. In KERA Art & Seek. North Texas Public Broadcasting Inc., 2008.
 Rapsodia Latina. Compact disc recording with the Lin / Castro-Balbi Duo (Gloria Lin, piano). Marlos Nobre Desafio II, Op. 31 No. 2bis; William Bolcom Gingando: Brazilian Tango Tempo; and the world premiere recordings of Esteban Benzecry Toccata y Misterio and Rapsodia Andina; Gabriela Frank Manhattan Serenades; Marlos Nobre Poema III, Op. 94 No. 3; Manuel Ponce Lejos de ti; Luis Sandi Sonatina; and Joaquin Silva-Diaz Serenata. Filarmonika, 2007. FILA 0102.
 Passion and Glory. Compact disc recording with the Clavier Trio. Bedřich Smetana Trio in G Minor, Op. 15, and Brahms Trio in C Major, Op. 87. Clavier Trio, 2006.
 Anthony Newman: Complete Works for Cello and Piano. Re-release of Anthony Newman: Chamber Music (930 Records, 2003). 930 Records, 2006.
 Relax for Power with Hazel Gordon Lucas. Compact disc recording including works for cello and harp with Laura Logan: Debussy Beau Soir, Fauré Après un rêve, Jules Massenet Méditation, from Thaïs and Saint-Saëns Le Cygne. 2004.
 Anthony Newman: Chamber Music. Anthony Newman Sonata for Cello and Piano (world premiere recording), with the composer at the piano. 930 Records, 2003.
 Aprieto. Samuel Zyman Suite for Two Cellos (world premiere recording). Compact disc recording with Carlos Prieto. Urtext Digital Classics, 2002.
 The Music of Ezra Laderman, Vol. 4. Laderman Simões (world premiere recording) with the Yale Cellos, Aldo Parisot, conductor. Albany Records, 2001. TROY454

References

External links
 Jesús Castro-Balbi Official Website
 Kennesaw State University
 Dr. Bobbie Bailey School of Music

Year of birth missing (living people)
Living people
American cellists
Kennesaw State University faculty
Indiana University Bloomington alumni
Yale School of Music alumni
Juilliard School alumni
Place of birth missing (living people)